Kumagaya Rugby Stadium (熊谷ラグビー場), is a rugby stadium in Kumagaya, Saitama, Japan. It is currently used mostly for rugby union matches. The stadium was built in 1991 and renovated between 2016 and 2018. Its capacity expanded from 20,000 (10,000 seated) to 24,000 people (fully seated).

The stadium is part of a larger sports complex which includes the Kumagaya Athletic Stadium, a smaller athletics stadium and a large arena. The complex is located in the Kumagaya Park.

Uses
It is the main stadium for rugby in the Saitama Prefecture, and serves as the home stadium of Japan Rugby League One club Saitama Wild Knights. It is also used for University League games and sometimes also for other Top League games.

The stadium has been selected as one of the venues for 2019 Rugby World Cup (Japan) which will be the first Rugby World Cup to be held in Asia. 6,000 temporary seats will be added to increase the stadium capacity.

References

External links
 日本ラグビーフットボール協会（JRFU）- rugby-japan.jp
 TOP LEAGUE OFFICIAL SITE
 rugby.or.jp PDF
 2019-all-for-japan-team.jp

Rugby union stadiums in Japan
Sports venues in Saitama Prefecture
1991 establishments in Japan
Sports venues completed in 1991
Kumagaya